Bedekar is a surname. Notable people with the surname include:

 Malati Bedekar (1905–2001), Indian author
 Ninad Bedekar (1949–2015), Indian historian, writer, and orator
 Vishram Bedekar (1906–1998), Indian movie director

Marathi-language surnames